The Besta deild kvenna is the top-tier women's football league in Iceland. It features 10 teams that play a double round robin to decide the champion, which qualifies for a spot in the UEFA Women's Champions League. The 2022 season was the first season of the league after it was rebranded as Besta deild kvenna; previously, it had been named Úrvalsdeild kvenna.

History
The Icelandic women's tournament began in 1972. Eight teams competed in two groups and the top team from each group, FH and Ármann. met in a final where FH won 2–0. In 1976, only five team registered for competition so the group arrangement was abandoned and instead the teams played in one division with home and away games. The following years, fewer and fewer teams participated, due to lack of training, lack of access to Grass fields, and little or none youth programs. After only three teams participating in 1980, the tide turned the following season with five new teams registering for competition and the addition of the Icelandic Women's Football Cup.  On 24 February 2022, the league was rebranded as Besta deild kvenna.

Champions
The list of all champions

 1972: FH
 1973: Ármann
 1974: FH
 1975: FH
 1976: FH
 1977: Breiðablik
 1978: Valur
 1979: Breiðablik
 1980: Breiðablik
 1981: Breiðablik
 1982: Breiðablik
 1983: Breiðablik
 1984: ÍA
 1985: ÍA
 1986: Valur
 1987: ÍA
 1988: Valur
 1989: Valur
 1990: Breiðablik
 1991: Breiðablik
 1992: Breiðablik
 1993: KR
 1994: Breiðablik
 1995: Breiðablik
 1996: Breiðablik
 1997: KR
 1998: KR
 1999: KR
 2000: Breiðablik
 2001: Breiðablik
 2002: KR
 2003: KR
 2004: Valur
 2005: Breiðablik
 2006: Valur
 2007: Valur
 2008: Valur
 2009: Valur
 2010: Valur
 2011: Stjarnan
 2012: Þór/KA
 2013: Stjarnan
 2014: Stjarnan
 2015: Breiðablik
 2016: Stjarnan
 2017: Þór/KA
 2018: Breiðablik
 2019: Valur
2020: Breiðablik
2021: Valur
 2022: Valur

By club

Players

Players of the year

Source:

Top goalscorers of all time

Source: KSI

Top scorers by season

See also
 Úrvalsdeild karla (men's football league)

References

External links
Standings on Official Site
women.soccerway.com
 IcelandFootball.net - List of Ladies First Level Champions 

 
women
Summer association football leagues
Ice
Women's football in Iceland
Women's sports leagues in Iceland
Úrvalsdeild Women
Professional sports leagues in Iceland
Sports leagues established in 1972
1972 establishments in Iceland